XLF  may refer to:
XLF (protein), XRCC4-like factor
.xlf, the filename extension  for XLIFF
 ICAO code for XL Airways France